The following are lists of FCC-licensed radio stations in the unincorporated territories of the United States, which can be sorted by their call signs, frequencies, cities of license, licensees, and programming formats.

American Samoa

Guam

Northern Mariana Islands

Puerto Rico

United States Virgin Islands

Wake Island
 KEAD (1490 AM, Defunct)

See also
 Media of Puerto Rico

References

Bibliography
    

 
Territories
Radio